Bond Education Group operates several private schools in Toronto, Ontario. It was established in 1978 and as of 2015, located at 1500 Birchmount Road in Scarborough, originally the former factory of Laura Secord Chocolates.

Bond Education Group consists of the following schools:
Bond Academy; a co-educational, non-denominational independent school with classes for pre-school children up to grade 12. It includes:
Bond Montessori Casa; providing Montessori education for pre-school children
Bond International College; offers international students a Canadian education in a diverse, multicultural environment
Bond Schools International; a program where schools in China are offering a Double Diploma Program for an Ontario Secondary School Diploma and Chinese High School Diploma
Bond Centre for Leadership and Management Development; a professional training division 
New Skills College of Health, Business & Technology; offers post-secondary training in health care, business and technology fields.

See also
List of high schools in Ontario

References
 Bond Education Group

Private colleges in Ontario
Educational institutions established in 1978
1978 establishments in Ontario